John Godwin  (by 1520 – 1547?) of Wells, Somerset, was an English politician.

He was a Member (MP) of the Parliament of England for Wells in 1542.

References

1547 deaths
English MPs 1542–1544
People from Wells, Somerset
Year of birth uncertain